The Grammy Rap Nominees was a series of various artists compilation albums that were released from 1999–2001. Albums are released before the airing of the annual Grammy Awards. All of the songs on the albums are Grammy nominated in the year released. The last edition, released in 2001 was a compilation of both rap and R&B nominated songs.

1999

2000

2001

See also

 Grammy Nominees

Compilation album series
Hip hop compilation albums